Ålen is a former municipality in the old Sør-Trøndelag county, Norway. The  former municipality existed from 1855 until 1972. It encompassed the southeastern half of what is now the municipality of Holtålen in Trøndelag county. The administrative centre was the village of Renbygda (also known as Ålen) where Ålen Church is located.

History
The parish of Ålen (historically spelled Aalen) was established as a civil municipality in 1855 when it was split off from the municipality of Holtaalen. Initially, Ålen had a population of 1,487. (The now smaller Holtaalen municipality later changed its name to Haltdalen in 1937.) In 1875, an uninhabited part of Ålen was moved to the neighboring municipality of Røros. On 1 January 1972, the municipality of Ålen was merged with the neighboring municipality of Haltdalen to make a new municipality called Holtålen, bringing back to use a name from an earlier municipality. Prior to the merger Ålen municipality had a population of 1,944. On 21 April 1989, a small unpopulated part of the neighboring municipality of Røros was transferred to Holtålen.

Name
The name of the municipality (and the parish) is Ålen which comes from the Old Norse word áll, meaning eel, which likely refers to the winding valley in which the main village centre is located.

Government
All municipalities in Norway, including Ålen, are responsible for primary education (through 10th grade), outpatient health services, senior citizen services, unemployment and other social services, zoning, economic development, and municipal roads. The municipality is governed by a municipal council of elected representatives, which in turn elects a mayor.

Municipal council
The municipal council  of Ålen was made up of 17 representatives that were elected to four year terms. The party breakdown of the final municipal council was as follows:

See also
List of former municipalities of Norway

References

Former municipalities of Norway
Holtålen
1855 establishments in Norway
1972 disestablishments in Norway